Gunnar Block Watne (8 July 1929 – 28 September 2016) was a Norwegian engineer and businessperson.

He was born in Sandnes, a son of timber trader Gabriel Block Watne and Randi Øglænd. Block Watne was a pioneer in introducing prefabricated houses in Norway. In the early 1980s his company Block Watne was the largest house building contractor in Scandinavia.

References

1929 births
2016 deaths
People from Sandnes
Norwegian engineers
Norwegian company founders